SonyLIV is an Indian subscription video on-demand over-the-top Internet streaming platform that has distributed a number of original streaming television  shows, including original series, specials and films. 
SonyLIV original productions also include licensing or co-producing content from international broadcasters for exclusive broadcast in India and other territories. which is also branded as SonyLIV original content.

LIV Originals 
These includes the TV shows, Mini-Series and films that are partly or fully distributed by SonyLIV, some of which are also Produced and co-produced with other digital labs and labelled as an original content.

TV Shows

Films

Exclusive programming 
These includes the exclusive digital streaming rights of the TV shows and films sold to SonyLIV by their respective production companies.

TV shows

Documentaries

Films 
Note that the Majority of sonyliv Exclusive premiere Films are from Indian regional languages including Tamil, Telugu, Kannada, Malayalam, Marathi and Gujarati. This list doesn't includes the theatrical released films.

Exclusive international distribution

TV shows

See also 

 Sony Pictures Networks India
List of Amazon India originals
List of Hotstar original films
List of Disney+ Hotstar original programming
List of Netflix India originals
List of ZEE5 original programming

References

External links
 List of Sonyliv Originals

Internet streaming services
Sony Pictures Networks India
Lists of television series by network
Lists of television series by streaming service
Video on demand services
Internet-related lists